Players born on or after 1 January 1985 were eligible to participate in the tournament. Players' age as of 13 July 2004 – the tournament's opening day. Players in bold have later been capped at full international level.

Group A

Head coach:  Marc Van Geersom

Head coach:  Paolo Berrettini

Head coach:  Pierre-André Schürmann

Head coach:  Pavlo Yakovenko

Group B

Head coach:  Dieter Eilts

Head coach:  Andrzej Zamilski

Head coach:  José Armando Ufarte

Head coach:  Gündüz Tekin Onay

Footnotes

UEFA European Under-19 Championship squads
Squads